Hoplocarida is a subclass of crustaceans. The only extant members are the mantis shrimp (Stomatopoda), but two other orders existed in the Palaeozoic: Aeschronectida and Palaeostomatopoda.

References

Malacostraca
Arthropod subclasses